The 1980 SEC women's basketball tournament took place February 7–10 in Knoxville, Tennessee.  It was the first SEC women's basketball tournament in history.

Tennessee won the tournament by beating Ole Miss in the championship game.

Tournament

Asterisk denotes game ended in overtime.

All-Tournament team 
Lori Monroe, Auburn
Valerie Still, Kentucky
Peggie Gillom, Ole Miss
Carol Ross, Ole Miss
Cindy Noble, Tennessee
Jill Rankin, Tennessee (MVP)
Holly Warlick, Tennessee

References

SEC women's basketball tournament
1980 in sports in Tennessee
College basketball tournaments in Tennessee
Sports in Knoxville, Tennessee
Women's sports in Tennessee